Starburst is a British science fiction magazine published by Starburst Magazine Limited. Starburst contains news, interviews, features, and reviews of genre material in various media, including TV, film, soundtracks, multimedia, books, and comics books. The magazine is published quarterly, with additional news and reviews being published daily on the website.

Publication history
Starburst was launched in December 1977 by editor Dez Skinn with his own company Starburst Publishing Ltd. The name Starburst was settled on after rejecting other names, including Starfall, as Skinn considered it too negative.

Starburst was taken over by Marvel UK with issue #4, as part of deal whereby Skinn was put in charge of the UK comic reprints division. Marvel put the title up for sale in 1985 and it was bought by Visual Imagination and published by them from issue #88.

Having reached issue #365 in 2008, the magazine ceased publishing due to Visual Imagination folding.

In early 2011 Starburst Magazine Ltd announced that Starburst would resume publication as an online magazine. Founder Dez Skinn was named Honorary Editor-in-Chief. The first online issue (#366) was released on 14 May 2011, and carried an editorial by Skinn.

Starburst was returned to print publication by Starburst Magazine Ltd in February 2012, with issue #374.

The magazine celebrated its 40-year anniversary with issue #443 (2017), which included an editorial by creator Dez Skinn. Starburst headquarters is now based in Manchester.

Editors-in-chief
 1977–1981: Dez Skinn
 1981–1985: Alan McKenzie
 1985: Cefn Ridout
 1985–1999: Stephen Payne
 1999–2001: David Richardson
 2001: Andrew Cartmel
 2001–2002: Gary Gillatt
 2002: Stephen Payne
 2003–2005: Simon J. Gerard
 2005–2009: Stephen Payne
 2009–2022: Jordan Royce
 2022–present: Kris Heys

Columns and features 
Starbursts review sections were edited by writers and reviewers such as Alan Jones (films) and David J. Howe (books), and, for several years, the magazine also carried a column by the writer John Brosnan. Its television review column, TV Zone, was used as the title of its sister publication, TV Zone.

Current columns 
 TV Zone by Paul Mount 
 It's Only a Movie by Jordan Royce; previously penned by the late John Brosnan 
 Horror Obscura by assistant editor Martin Unsworth
 Brave New Words (books) and Roll for Damage (TTRPGS) by literary editor Ed Fortune
 OST by Nick Spacek

Multimedia

Starburst radio
On 19 March 2011 Starburst magazine presented its first weekly radio show on Manchester Radio Online. The show has since moved to Fab Radio International.

Starburst podcasts
Starburst produces the following podcasts:

 Starburst Radio Podcast: The podcast of the Official Starburst Radio Show presented by Martin Unsworth, Kris Heys and Mike Royce
 The Blue Box Podcast: The Starburst Doctor Who podcast presented by JR Southall
 Brave New Words: The Starburst book and graphic novel podcast presented by Ed Fortune, the magazine's literary editor
 TV Zone Plus: The podcast of the TV Zone column, presented by TV Zone columnist Paul Mount

Starburst festivals

1980: Marvel Comics Film & Fantasy Convention 
On 18–19 October 1980, Starburst (at that point owned by Marvel UK) produced the  inaugural Marvel Comics Film & Fantasy Convention at Lawrence Hall, London. The guest of honor was Ray Harryhausen; other guests include Barry Morse, Paul Darrow, Jacqueline Pearce, Ingrid Pitt, Caroline Munro, Dana Gillespie, David Prowse, Peter Mayhew, Milton Subotsky, Roy Ashton, Martin Bower, Harley Cokeliss, Mat Irvine, Brian Johnson, Terrance Dicks, David Maloney, Dick Mills, and Richard O'Brien. The convention included the presentation of the 1980 Starburst Awards as well as the 1980 Eagle Awards.

2016: Starburst International Film Festival
From 26–28 August 2016 the first Starburst International Film Festival was held at Manchester Metropolitan Students' Union Complex. Guests included Dez Skinn, Doug Naylor, Steve Pemberton, and Toby Whithouse. The festival culminated in the Starburst Fantasy Awards 2016 on Sunday 28 August 2016 in which Doug Naylor won the Hall of Fame Award.

2018: Starburst MediaCity Festival
With a sponsorship deal secured with MediaCityUK the second annual festival was slightly re-branded. Starburst MediaCity Festival was held 16–17 March 2018. Guests included Dez Skinn and Tom Paton. Winners of the STARBURST Fantasy Awards 2018 included Emma Dark for Best Director with Salient Minus Ten, and Michael Melski for Best Feature with The Child Remains.

References

External links

1977 establishments in the United Kingdom
Film magazines published in the United Kingdom
Magazines established in 1977
Magazines published in Manchester
Marvel UK titles
Monthly magazines published in the United Kingdom
Science fiction magazines published in the United Kingdom
Science fiction-related magazines